For the other Virginian town named Inglewood, see Inglewood, Mecklenburg County, Virginia.

Inglewood is an unincorporated community in Rockingham County, Virginia, United States. It is located northwest of Berrytown.

Inglewood is part of the Harrisonburg Metropolitan Statistical Area.

Unincorporated communities in Rockingham County, Virginia
Unincorporated communities in Virginia